Ottivakkam  is a suburb of Chennai located south of Tirumani. It has a suburban railway station and falls under south line.

Villages in Chengalpattu district